Greensleeves Rhythm Album #34: Masterpiece is an album in Greensleeves Records' rhythm album series.  It was released in December 2002 on CD and LP.  The album features various artists recorded over the "Masterpiece" riddim.  The riddim was produced by Steven "Lenky" Marsden for 40/40 Productions.  The riddim was Marsden's first since the hugely successful Diwali riddim earlier in 2002.  It featured the hit "Ever Blazin'" by Sean Paul.

Track listing
"Give Her It Good" - Elephant Man
"Ever Blazin'" - Sean Paul
"10 Out of 10" - Beenie Man
"Wine Baby Wine" - Danny English & Egg Nog
"Raging Storm" - Bounty Killer
"Check Yourself" - Wayne Marshall
"So Fly" - Chico
"Dat She Like" - Spragga Benz
"Uh Huh" - Mr. Vegas
"Rock Me" - Crissy D
"Stress Free" - Bling Dawg
"Shake It" - Zumjay
"The Answer" - Assassin
"The Mirror" - Degree
"Critical" - Aisha
"Anything You Wear" - Lexxus
"That Girl" - T.O.K.
"Price Tag" - Buccaneer
"Own Man" - Tanya Stephens
"Have Some Fun" - Desperado
"Real Good" - Hawkeye
"Masterpiece 2.5" - Steven "Lenky" Marsden

2002 compilation albums
Reggae compilation albums
Greensleeves Records albums